Scientist.com (formerly known as Assay Depot) is a network of public and private e-commerce marketplaces that connect buyers and sellers of scientific research services. The company was founded in 2007 by Kevin Lustig, Chris Petersen and Andrew Martin and launched its first public research marketplace in September 2008.

History
Research marketplaces make it possible for scientists to use contract research organizations (CROs) to outsource an entire pharmaceutical drug discovery project without requiring physical access to a laboratory. The company has been referred to as the “Amazon.com for medical research,” “A Home Depot for science and medicine” and the “EBay for drug discovery services." In 2011 and 2012, Scientist.com launched outsourcing marketplaces for the large pharmaceutical companies Pfizer and AstraZeneca, respectively. The marketplace was featured in a 2012 TEDMED talk given by then-Stanford University professor Atul Butte. In 2013, the company launched a private academic marketplace for the National Cancer Institute. By June 2016, when the company rebranded as Scientist.com, it operated private research marketplaces for 10 pharmaceutical companies and the US National Institutes of Health. In 2017, Scientist.com rolled out a series of new marketplace features to attract more customers, including COMPLi, a comprehensive process that oversees the sourcing of regulated services for scientific research, such as the legal and ethical acquisition of biological specimens, animal welfare, toxicology studies, secondary real world evidence (RWE), health economics and outcomes research (HEOR), and GxP services. By the end of 2017, the company operated private marketplaces for most of the world's major pharmaceutical companies and entered into a collaboration with VWR International to create an end-to-end research solution. In 2018, Scientist.com launched DataSmart, a platform to ensure data integrity; DataSmart is based on proprietary blockchain technology developed by Scientist.com. The company also opened an office in Tokyo, Japan in 2018 in order to work more closely with Japanese pharma companies. In 2019, Scientist.com unveiled its first original service offering, Trial Insights, a digital reporting platform that aggregates publicly available clinical trials data into usable online dashboards. Later in 2019, Scientist.com launched SciPay, an early-payment program for the thousands of registered suppliers on its marketplace. In late 2020, Scientist.com acquired HealthEconomics.Com, the world’s leading ConnectedCommunity in the Value, Evidence and Access space. Then, in 2021, Scientist.com completed three additional acquisitions, one of which was InsideScientific, an online environment that facilitates the exchange of scientific information via webinars, podcasts, and more. Next, was Notch8, which provides software and app development services, and have since rebranded as Scientist.com Software Solutions. Lastly, is  BioPharmCatalyst, an online resource for stock market investors of publicly traded biotech and pharmaceutical companies listed on U.S. markets (NASDAQ and NYSE).

Awards
In 2013, Lustig was named “San Diego’s Most Admired CEO” by the San Diego Business Journal, and that same year he was one of five national finalists for Entrepreneur magazine's Emerging Entrepreneur of the Year Award. Lustig was twice recognized as one of the life science industry's “100 Most Inspiring People” by PharmaVoice magazine in 2012 and 2013. In 2013, Petersen received the CIO 100 Award, and in 2014, he was named one of “San Diego’s Top Tech Execs” by the San Diego Business Journal. The company also won the San Diego Business Journal’s 2014 Innovation Award. In 2015, 2018, and 2019, the company was named one of Entrepreneur magazine’s Best Entrepreneurial Companies in America. From 2017-2019, Scientist.com ranked no. 155, 9, and 289, respectively on Inc. magazine’s list of the 500 Fastest-Growing privately-owned companies in America. Scientist.com also made Inc. magazine's list of Best Workplaces of 2018 and 2019. Scientist.com was ranked by San Diego Business Journal as the 2nd Fastest-Growing Private Company in 2018 and the 10th Fastest-Growing Private Company in 2019. In 2018, Scientist.com won the Excellence in Pharma: Regulatory and Compliance Framework award for its COMPLi framework. COMPLi introduces an appropriate due diligence process and service-specific supply agreement to support access to regulated services. In 2019, CTO and co-founder Chris Petersen was awarded the Cox Business Exemplary Award as part of San Diego’s 2019 “Top Tech Awards.” In 2019, Scientist.com ranked 86th on the Deloitte Technology Fast 500 list of fastest-growing technology companies in North America. Near the end of 2019, Scientist.com's early-payment program, SciPay was Highly Commended in the Technology & Telecoms category at the annual Supply Chain Finance Awards. In 2020, Lustig was named one San Diego's Most Influential People by the San Diego Business Journal. In 2020, Lustig was named one of the 500 Most Influential People in San Diego by the San Diego Business Journal. In both 2020 and 2021, Scientist.com was named one of America's Fastest-Growing Companies by the Financial Times, ranking no. 63 and 132, respectively. Also, in 2020 and 2021, Scientist.com was honored as one of the nation's fastest-growing private companies by Inc. magazine for the fourth and fifth consecutive year.

Business model
Scientist.com is a procure-to-pay B2B e-commerce marketplace. Research customers use the marketplace to design, purchase and pay for custom research services and products.  Research suppliers, or contract research organizations (CROs), use the marketplace to communicate with customers, submit quotes, receive orders and submit invoices.  Scientist.com receives a transaction fee on all marketplace purchases.

Projects

COVID Collaboration Center
In spring of 2020, during the COVID-19 pandemic, Scientist.com created a free online tool called the Covid Collaboration Center. Its goal was to empower researchers, protect healthcare workers and help cure this disease.The website connected COVID-19 researchers and promote collaboration, data-sharingand academic and industry partnerships.

Rare Disease Challenges
In 2013, Scientist.com partnered with the Rare Genomics Institute to create and run a science challenge called Be HEARD (Helping Empower and Accelerate Research Discoveries). Half a million dollars worth of scientific services, ranging in value from $2,500 to $75,000, were awarded to 26 rare disease researchers. In 2015, the Be HEARD science challenge resulted in over $600,000 in awards to 31 rare disease research programs. In 2017, Scientist.com partnered with Global Genes to sponsor the “RARE Battle of the Brains,” a Shark Tank-style pitch competition between early-stage innovators from biotech and academia.

Open Science Challenges
In 2012, Scientist.com partnered with BioCurious in the Bay Area and Genspace in New York to run open science challenges for citizen and young scientists. In 2018, Scientist.com joined France's Brain and Spine Institute incubator, iPEPS-ICM, to launch a call for early stage biotechs to pitch novel approaches to fighting central nervous systems (CNS) disease.

Community Involvement

STREAM Lab 
In 2018, Scientist.com announced its donation of $5,000 to the Solana Beach Schools Foundation, which was used to support Skyline Elementary School’s newly-constructed STREAM (Science, Technology, Research, Engineering, Art, and Math) Discovery Labs. This donation helped purchase supplies for coding and robotics, educational engineering software, and more.

100 Years of the 19th Amendment Campaign 
In 2019, Scientist.com partnered up with the Women in Bio Southern California Chapter to help support their campaign, which commemorated the 100th anniversary of the passing of the 19th amendment. Scientist.com created a social media campaign which highlighted 19 exceptional women scientists on each of the 19 days leading up to June 4, 2019, the 100th anniversary of the passing of the 19th amendment. Scientist.com donated $1 for every social media engagement on both their own social media and WIB-Southern California's as well, which totaled $5,000.

Touch a Truck San Diego 
In 2019, Scientist.com sponsored Touch a Truck San Diego, a car show for kids that raises money to help fund the discovery of more effective and less toxic therapies for kids battling aggressive cancers. Scientist.com donated $8,000 this year to help fund this event, which was also put on by the Beat Childhood Cancer Foundation.

Metastatic Breast Cancer Impact Series 
In 2019, Scientist.com donated $7,500 to help sponsor the Susan G. Komen Metastatic Breast Cancer Impact Series, which is a series of free events that provides individuals battling metastatic breast cancer and their loved ones with information and resources as well as an opportunity to engage with each other and industry experts.

Childhood Cancer Awareness Month, Go Gold 
In 2021, Scientist.com sponsored Rady Children's Hospital San Diego's initiative, Go Gold for Rady Children’s Peckham Center for Cancer and Blood Disorders. Scientist.com donated $5,000, which went directly to programs and services at Rady Children’s Peckham Center for Cancer and Blood Disorders.

Local Experiment - Collaboration with Pizza Port Brewing Co. 
In 2021, Scientist.com teamed up with fellow Solana Beach native, Pizza Port Brewing Company , to celebrate the thriving San Diego biotech and brewery scene. They co-created a limited-edition beer, entitled "The Local Experiment", which was distributed at Pizza Port locations across San Diego and at the special launch party held at the Solana Beach location on December 8.

Tropical Brainstorm - Collaboration with New Motion Beverages 
In 2022, Scientist.com joined forces with another San Diego brewery, New Motion Beverages, to highlight San Diego's cultural scene, which prominently includes many world famous biotech and pharmaceutical companies and craft breweries. They created a hard sparkling tea called the "Tropical Brainstorm", which was launched on April 28 during their special release party at New Motion Beverages.

Solana Beach Pollinator Garden 
In 2022, Scientist.com donated $3,000 to the Seaweeders', the Solana Beach Gardening Club, to match their previously fundraised amount of $3,000. This donation helped the Seaweeders to plant pollinator gardens throughout the community of Solana Beach and to promote the sustainable beautification of the city.

Ukraine Refugee Support 
In 2022, Scientist.com conducted a company wide donation initiative to aid Ukrainian refugees amidst the Russian war conflict. They donated to a volunteer group called Rhein-Dnipro which purchases food at discounted rates, and then works with Polish trucking companies to deliver the donations. Scientist.com decided to double the total amount donated, and proceeded to donate $30,000 to this organization.

Investors
The company raised $1.8M in October 2007 from family and friends.  In June 2011, the company raised $1.7M from Hollywood producer Jack Giarraputo and friends.  In March 2014, the company raised $3.4M in financing led by Jean Balgrosky of Bootstrap Ventures. In May 2017, the company raised $24M in an equity financing co-led by Boston-based Leerink Transformation Partners (LTP) and San Francisco and Boston-based 5AM Ventures; new investors included Heritage Provider Network, and existing investors Bootstrap Ventures and Jack Giarraputo also participated.

References

2007 establishments in California
Business services companies established in 2007
Companies based in California
Online marketplaces of the United States
Solana Beach, California
Business-to-business